The population of Iraqis in Saudi Arabia includes Saudi Arabian citizens of Iraqi ancestry as well as Iraqi citizen expatriates living in Saudi Arabia. According to the UNHCR, about 17,000 Arab Shia Iraqis who fled to Saudi Arabia during the Iran–Iraq War lived in the country with de facto refugee status; another 33,000 Iraqis fled to Saudi Arabia from U.S.-led attacks, of whom about 5,200 remained in the camp at Rafha.

Notable people
Abdul Rahman Munif, novelist.   
( Born in Saudi Arabia - Saudi Father/Iraqi Mother - Has Saudi Arabian Citizenship )
Waed, musician and entertainer  
( Born in Saudi Arabia - Saudi Father/Iraqi Mother - Has Saudi Arabian Citizenship )
Ahmad Totonji, activist         
( Born in Iraq - Iraqi Father/Iraqi Mother - Has Saudi Arabian Citizenship )

See also
Iraq–Saudi Arabia relations

References

 

Arabs in Saudi Arabia
Saudi Arabia
Ethnic groups in Saudi Arabia